Ebdalaya (Dargwa: ЭбдалгӀяя) is a rural locality (a selo) and the administrative centre of Ebdalayansky Selsoviet, Levashinsky District, Republic of Dagestan, Russia. The population was 811 as of 2010. There are 18 streets.

Geography 
Ebdalaya is located 8 km southeast of Levashi (the district's administrative centre) by road, on the Khalagork and Tashkapurkherk River. Barkhakent and Khasakent are the nearest rural localities.

Nationalities 
Dargins live there.

References 

Rural localities in Levashinsky District